Jaramijó Canton is a canton of Ecuador, located in the Manabí Province.  Its capital is the town of Jaramijó.  Its population at the 2001 census was 11,967.

Demographics
Ethnic groups as of the Ecuadorian census of 2010:
Mestizo  76.4%
Afro-Ecuadorian  12.8%
Montubio  5.0%
White  4.3%
Indigenous  0.1%
Other  1.5%

References

Cantons of Manabí Province